Sun & Ski Sports is a United States-based specialty sporting goods retail company headquartered in Stafford, Texas. Established in 1980, Sun & Ski Sports currently has 31 stores stretching coast to coast across 12 states. They offer a wide variety of products but specialize in skiing, snowboarding, cycling, hiking, running gear, and watersports. Their mission is to provide an elevated shopping experience through exceptional customer service, first-hand expertise, and competitively priced brands ready to perform for any adventure.

Locations 
As of 2022, Sun & Ski Sports operates out of 31 locations across the United States. Their headquarters is in Stafford, Texas, right outside of Houston. In Texas, they have locations in Austin, Dallas, Fort Worth, Houston, McAllen, and San Antonio. Outside of Texas, Sun & Ski Sports has locations in California, Colorado, Maryland, Massachusetts, New Hampshire, New York, North Carolina, Oklahoma, Tennessee, Utah, and Virginia. Some of their locations, such as California, Colorado, and Utah, are situated near major mountain resort destinations to help customers with their adventure.

Store & Website Services

The retailer offers gear – including apparel, footwear, electronic equipment and more - for the following categories:
 snow sports – including skiing & snowboarding
 water sports- including water skiing, wakeboarding, and paddle boarding
 running
 cycling- including kids' bikes, mountain, road, hybrid, gravel, and electric.
hiking
 They also offer full-service ski, snowboard, and bike services from tuning, repairs, and ski and snowboard waxing.

In-store, the retailer offers trade-up programs where customers can trade-in their equipment for credit towards a newer version or model. For bikes, they take part in the Bicycle Blue Book Trade-in Program as well as their Kid's Bike Trade-Up Program.

Sun & Ski Sports carries a wide range of products from apparel, footwear, accessories, and technical gear such as skis, snowboards, and bikes. They offer brands such as Patagonia, Columbia, The North Face, Spyder, Cannondale, Burton, Rossignol, Salomon, Hoka, On, Garmin, Billabong, and more.

History 
Sun & Ski Sports started as Tennis and Ski Warehouse in the Midwest United States by Barry Goldware. Barry, an avid skier himself, noticed a need in the cold weather gear industry. With this idea in mind, he set up shop in Houston, Texas, and started to provide specialized equipment for the local skiers and snowboarders. Eventually, the business grew from skiing and snowboarding to the product assortment it has today, which includes cycling, running gear, hiking gear, watersports, and more.

In 2012, Sun & Ski Sports changed ownership from Barry Goldware. Frank Stanley and Steve Rath both became Co-CEO’s while Karl Salz joined as president of Sun & Ski Sports.

Sun & Ski Sports has grown to over 30 locations across the United States, including multiple resort locations, which include California, Colorado, New Hampshire, and Utah.

Community Initiatives 
Each Sun & Ski Sports location utilizes community and outreach initiatives to help make their local communities stronger while growing the sports and adventures they cater to. Besides operating numerous local running and cycling clubs, Sun & Ski Sports participates in nationwide drives and initiatives such as Bike MS: Texas MS 150, a yearly 150+ mile bike ride to raise money to help end Multiple Sclerosis. Since 2001, Sun & Ski Sports has raised over five million dollars for the cause.

References 

Companies based in Houston
Economy of the Eastern United States
Economy of the Southwestern United States
Sporting goods retailers of the United States
Online retailers of the United States